This article describes a 2006 album in the U.S. Now! series. It should not be confused with similarly or identically-titled albums belonging to different "Now!" series. For more information, see Now That's What I Call Music! discography.

Now That's What I Call Christmas! 3 is a 2006 double-CD album from the hit franchise Now That's What I Call Music!, released in the US on October 10, 2006.  The album has sold over a million copies in the US.

Track listing

Disc 1

Disc 2

Charts

Weekly charts

Year-end charts

See also
 List of Billboard Top Holiday Albums number ones of the 2000s

References

External links
 Now That's What I Call Christmas! 3 front- and backcover

Now That's What I Call Music! Christmas albums
2006 compilation albums
2006 Christmas albums
Christmas 03
Pop Christmas albums